Wilcox County is a county of the U.S. state of Alabama. As of the 2020 census, the population was 10,600. Its county seat is Camden.

History
Wilcox County was established on December 13, 1819. The county was named after Joseph M. Wilcox, a US Army lieutenant who was killed in Alabama during the Creek War.

Geography

Major highways
 State Route 5
 State Route 10
 State Route 21
 State Route 25
 State Route 28
 State Route 41
 State Route 89
 State Route 162
 State Route 164
 State Route 221
 State Route 265

Adjacent counties
Dallas County (northeast)
Lowndes County (east-northeast)
Butler County (east-southeast)
Monroe County (south)
Clarke County (southwest)
Marengo County (northwest)

Demographics

2020 census

As of the 2020 United States census, there were 10,600 people, 3,854 households, and 2,284 families residing in the county.

2010 census
As of the 2010 United States Census, there were 11,670 people living in the county. 72.5% were Black or African American, 26.8% White, 0.1% Native American, 0.1% of some other race and 0.4% of two or more races. 0.6% were Hispanic or Latino (of any race).

2000 census
As of the census of 2000, there were 13,183 people, 4,776 households, and 3,376 families living in the county.  The population density was 15 people per square mile (6/km2).  There were 6,183 housing units at an average density of 7 per square mile (3/km2).  The racial makeup of the county was 71.90% Black or African American, 27.51% White,  0.14% Native American, 0.13% Asian, 0.02% Pacific Islander, 0.11% from other races, and 0.19% from two or more races.  Nearly 0.74% of the population were Hispanic or Latino of any race.

There were 4,776 households, out of which 36.00% had children under the age of 18 living with them, 39.80% were married couples living together, 26.50% had a female householder with no husband present, and 29.30% were non-families. Nearly 27.50% of all households were made up of individuals, and 11.90% had someone living alone who was 65 years of age or older.  The average household size was 2.70, and the average family size was 3.31.

In the county, the population was spread out, with 30.70% under the age of 18, 9.10% from 18 to 24, 25.50% from 25 to 44, 21.00% from 45 to 64, and 13.70% who were 65 years of age or older.  The median age was 34 years. For every 100 females, there were 87.20 males.  For every 100 females age 18 and over, there were 81.00 males.

The median income for a household in the county was $16,646, and the median income for a family was $22,200. Males had a median income of $26,216 versus $17,274 for females. The per capita income for the county was $10,903.  About 36.10% of families and 39.90% of the population were below the poverty line, including 48.40% of those under age 18 and 32.10% of those age 65 or over.

Government
Wilcox County leans heavily towards the Democratic Party. The only Republican to carry the county since 1900 has been Barry Goldwater in 1964 – when little to none of the county's black majority had voted for over seven decades and opposition by the voting white minority to Civil Rights meant that national Democrat Lyndon Johnson was not allowed on the ballot. Even after the Voting Rights Act of 1965, black registration was so slow that segregationist George Wallace comfortably carried the county in 1968, but since then the Democratic presidential candidate has carried Wilcox in every election. It was one of only six Wallace counties to vote for George McGovern against Richard Nixon’s 3,000-plus-county landslide of 1972.

Religion
According to the Association of Religion Data Archives at Pennsylvania State University, religious affiliation in Wilcox County in 2010 was as follows:
 African Methodist Episcopal Church (2443 adherents)
 Southern Baptist Convention (2177)
 Nondenominational Protestant (477)
 The United Methodist Church (463)
 Pentecostalism (320)
 Lutheran Church–Missouri Synod (262)
 Christian Methodist Episcopal Church (251)
 Churches of Christ (206)

Education
All public schools in the county are operated by the Wilcox County School District and include Camden School of Arts and Technology and Wilcox Central Academy. The community is also served by one private school, Wilcox Academy, founded in 1970 as a segregation academy. The public schools are effectively all-Black.

Economy
Major industries in the county include a paper mill operated by International Paper, based in Memphis, Tennessee, on the Alabama River near Pine Hill that employs roughly 400 people, and a copper tubing plant owned by Golden Dragon Copper Group of Xinxiang, China in Sunny South that opened in 2014; it employs approximately 300.

Communities

City
Camden (county seat)

Towns
Oak Hill
Pine Apple
Pine Hill
Yellow Bluff

Census-designated places
Boykin
Catherine

Unincorporated communities

Ackerville
Alberta
Anne Manie
Arlington
Bethel
Canton Bend
Coy
Fatama
Furman
Gastonburg
Gee's Bend
Kimbrough
Lamison
Lower Peach Tree
McWilliams
Millers Ferry
Pebble Hill
Prairie
Rockwest
Rosebud
Snow Hill
Sunny South

Ghost towns
Prairie Bluff
Ruthven

Places of interest
Wilcox County is home to Roland Cooper State Park, Lake Dannelly, and Bridgeport Beach.

Notable people
William Q. Atwood, former slave who became a lumber baron based in Saginaw, Michigan
Judy L. Bonner, 28th President of The University of Alabama
Fred Cone, former running back in the NFL for the Green Bay Packers and Dallas Cowboys
James Crawford (basketball), former professional basketball player who played in the Australian National Basketball League
Laurance L. Cross, Presbyterian minister and Mayor of Berkeley, California
Marie Foster, leader in the U.S. Civil Rights Movement
Kenneth R. Giddens, Broadcaster and Voice of America executive
John Cooper Godbold, United States Circuit Judge of the United States Court of Appeals for the Eleventh Circuit and the United States Court of Appeals for the Fifth Circuit
Kay Ivey, 54th governor of Alabama
Philemon T. Herbert, former U.S. Representative from California
Bill Lee (musician), American musician
Noah Purifoy, visual artist and sculptor
Benjamin M. Miller, 39th governor of Alabama
Lucy Mingo, American quilt maker and member of the Gee's Bend Collective
Estella Payton, co-star on the Woman's World cooking show that aired on WKRG-TV in Mobile, Alabama
Joseph Smitherman, mayor of Selma, Alabama
William J. Vaughn, American university professor, school principal, librarian and book collector
Rosa Young, Lutheran educator from Rosebud

See also
National Register of Historic Places listings in Wilcox County, Alabama
Properties on the Alabama Register of Landmarks and Heritage in Wilcox County, Alabama
Rufus Randolph Rhodes

References

Notes

External links
 Wilcox County map of roads/towns (map © 2007 Univ. of Alabama).
Wilcox County Chamber of Commerce

 

 
1819 establishments in Alabama
Populated places established in 1819
Black Belt (U.S. region)
Majority-minority counties in Alabama